The Pre-existing Condition Insurance Plan (PCIP) is a form of health insurance coverage offered to uninsured Americans who have been unable to obtain coverage because of a pre-existing condition. It will provide coverage to as many as 350,000 people and fill the gap until the Affordable Care Act goes into effect in 2014. The plan has been funded by congress through the Department of Health and Human Services to monitor and distribute. States are either individually run or administered by HHS with 23 states and the District of Columbia. The plan is open through an Association or Government Employees Health Association (GEHA). The program has since ceased in order to make certain funding would be sufficient to carry the existing approximately 100,000 members it has taken on since PCIP inception.

To be eligible, patients must have a pre-existing condition, be uninsured for at least 6 months, and be a US citizen or a legal resident.

The Affordable Care Act provides federal funding to support Pre-Existing Condition Insurance Plans in every state and downloadable applications are available in the states where the US Department of Health and Human Services is running the PCIP. In those states, coverage will begin on August 1, 2010 for applicants who apply by July 15, 2010.

Pre-Existing Condition Insurance Plans are designed to provide affordable insurance to Americans with pre-existing conditions. The premiums are based on the standard cost of an individual health insurance policy in the health insurance pool's geographic area and out-of-pocket maximums are limited to $5,950 for individuals and $11,900 for families.

Current Status of Pre-existing Condition Insurance Plans under ACA  

As of 2014, PCIP plans are no longer available. Rather, US citizens may opt to enroll in affordable health insurance plans through the Health insurance marketplace. Marketplace plans must cover treatment for pre-existing medical conditions. No insurance participating in the health insurance market place can reject you for coverage, charge more, or refuse to pay for essential health services for any prior medical condition. Moreover, once an individual is enrolled in the marketplace, insurance plans cannot deny coverage or raise rates solely based on your health.

Pre-existing Condition Insurance Plan for Non-US Citizens in USA 

There are several short term medical plans which cover uninsured non-US citizens who are visiting or living in the United States that cover pre-existing conditions. As opposed to traditional short term health insurance plans, these policies cover all pre-existing conditions. These plans cover more than typical acute onset of pre-existing condition plans.  Pre-Existing coverage policies for non-US Citizens are known as short term "Full Pre-Existing" coverage policies. Full Pre-Existing coverage plans cover all pre-existing conditions with no look back period. 

Full Pre-Existing policies may cover in-patient, out-patient, and specialist care related to the worsening of a pre-existing condition. However, unlike the ACA, they do not provide any preventive or maintenance care for pre-existing conditions. For insured members already undergoing care for a pre-existing conditions, these plans provide no coverage.

See also
 United States Department of Health and Human Services
 Visitor health insurance

References

External links
 PCIP.gov

Health insurance in the United States